Physetica cucullina is a species of moth of the family Noctuidae. It is endemic to New Zealand and can be found throughout the South Island, apart from in the Nelson district with the exception of the St Arnaud Range where it is present. It is likely to be also resident in Stewart Island. P. cucullina lives in shrubland at subalpine and alpine zones but can occur at sea-level in the more southern regions. The life history of this species is poorly documented. There is only one known record in the New Zealand Arthropod Collection of the larvae of this species having been reared. These larvae were reared on Leucopogon fraseri. Adults of this species is on the wing from October to March and are attracted to light. P. cucullina is almost identical in appearance to P. funerea. The only reliable distinguishing feature between the two species is the antennae of the male. P. cucullina is also very similar in appearance to P. sequens but P. sequens lacks the narrow black line on the forewing dorsum area that can be present on the forewings of P. cucullina.

Taxonomy 

This species was first described by Achille Guenée in 1868 and named Xylocampa cucullina. In 1898 George Hudson described and illustrated this species under the names Melanchra cucullina. Edward Meyrick, in 1912, placed this specie in the Aletia genus. Hudson again discussed this species in 1928 but under the name Aletia cucullina following Meyrick's placement. In 1988 J. S. Dugdale placed this species in the Aletia genus. In 2017 Robert Hoare undertook a review of New Zealand Noctuinae and placed this species in the genus Physetica. Hoare also synonymised Aletia obsecrata and Aletia probenota with P. cucullina and reinstated the synonymy of  Aletia parmata with P. cucullina. The male holotype specimen was collected by H. G. Knaggs, likely at Rakaia in Canterbury and is held at the Natural History Museum, London.

Description

Guenée first described the species as follows:
The male of this species has a wingspan of between 29 and 37 mm and the female has a wingspan of between 29 and 36 mm. This species has variable colouration of its forewings. P. cucullina is almost identical in appearance to P. funerea. The only reliable distinguishing feature between the two species is the antennae of the male. Male P. cucullina have antennae with distinct erect ciliations. The only other difference is that largest specimens of P. funerea have a greater wingspan than the largest known P. cucullina. P. sequens  is also similar in appearance to P. cucullina however the forewing dorsum area of the former species does not have the narrow black line that is frequently present on P. cucullina forewings.

Distribution 
It is endemic to New Zealand. This species is found throughout the South Island apart from in the Nelson district with the exception of the St Arnaud Range where it is present. It is likely to be also resident in Stewart Island.

Habitat 
P. cucullina lives in shrubland at subalpine and alpine zones but can occur at sea-level in the more southern regions.

Behaviour 
Adults of this species is on the wing from October to March and are attracted to light.

Life history and host species 

The life history of this species is poorly documented. As at 2017, there is no description of the larvae and there is only one known record in the New Zealand Arthropod Collection of the larvae of this species having being reared. This record indicates the larvae were reared on Leucopogon fraseri.

References

Hadeninae
Moths of New Zealand
Endemic fauna of New Zealand
Moths described in 1868
Taxa named by Achille Guenée
Endemic moths of New Zealand